Resonance is a quality of human relationships with the world proposed by Hartmut Rosa. Rosa, professor of sociology at the University of Jena, uses his resonance theory in Resonanz (2016) to explain social phenomena from a fundamental human quest for "resonant" relationships.

Resonance term 
The term resonance is taken from physics to describe a subject–object relationship as a vibrating system in which both sides mutually stimulate each other. In contrast to the physical meaning of the word, however, here they do not merely return the received sound, but speak "with their own voice". The subjects' relational abilities and their intersubjective structures are constituted by such resonance experiences or their absence. This is made clear by the primary relationship of the newborn to its reference person, by whose reception or rejection of interactions the fundamental relationship patterns develop. With the concept of resonance used in this way, an attempt is made to find a way of approaching the question of successful relations between subject and world in the sense of "good life" as free as possible from cultural evaluations and assumptions.

The possible points of reference of such resonances are ubiquitous and are described in three basic axes: Horizontal resonances take place between two (or more) people, in love and family relationships, friendships or political space. Diagonal resonance axes are relationships to things and activities, vertical resonance axes are relationships to the great collective singulars: nature, art, history or religion. In all these contexts, intensive experiences are possible that make life experienceable as an intensive encounter or relationship for its own sake. This is juxtaposed with silent or instrumental world relations, determined by the orientation towards domination and making available, which are primarily concerned with the achievement of a useful goal. For example, a mountain tour can be a resonance experience as an intensive confrontation with the demands of the path and the encountering nature, as a purely purpose-oriented company but also instrumental and in this sense "mute".

Obviously, world sections that are perceived as attractive or desirable are predestined for resonance experiences, while those that are perceived as hostile or anxious are expected to be "silent", non-resonant experiences. Another prerequisite for the establishment of resonances are strong evaluations of the subject, which give the object a significance that goes beyond desire or attractiveness.

If an attempt is made to outline as resonance what people seek and long for in their innermost being, it is by no means conceived as a permanent state that can be established, but always as a selective, momentary success or self-adjustment that stands out against the background of the predominantly silent, instrumental. Resonance in this sense is therefore essentially characterized by the fact that it cannot be produced systematically and intentionally, but is ultimately unavailable.

Social theory 
As a sociological theory, resonance theory deals with the social conditions that promote or hinder successful relationships. If the striving for resonance is regarded as ubiquitous human primary motivation, its concretization depends to a large extent on historical, geographical and cultural conditions. In particular, existential hardship and political repression complicate resonance experiences if they do not make them completely impossible. The promise of modernity is therefore to make resonance possible by overcoming political arbitrariness and improving material resources. Rosa sees this promise as an inherent contradiction of modernity, however, undermined by the conditions that progress, which is primarily geared to increasing resources, ultimately requires: Expanded resources expand the world accessible to the subject and thus his possibilities for resonance experiences. This results in a logic of increase, which requires a constant continuation of improvement and multiplication of resources. This is accompanied by an increasing pressure to accelerate: in order to maintain the status quo within a modern society, an increasingly rapid increase in services, innovations and material production is necessary. Rosa sees this mode of dynamic stabilization as constitutive for modernity: while pre-modern societies transform themselves adaptively, i.e. in response to changed conditions, modern society is virtually defined by its compulsion for continuous transformation.

While the current phase of late modernism is characterized by a high resonance sensitivity and expectation of its subjects, the mode of dynamic stabilization results in a loss of resonance possibilities. Rosa notes three essential manifestations of the current crisis of modernity:

 the ecological crisis due to the finite nature of natural resources compared to an unlimited expectation of increase
 the political crisis, which arises essentially from the fact that democratic negotiation processes are too slow for the accelerated technological and resulting social changes and are therefore regarded as ineffective or obsolete, and
 the psychological crisis of the subjects, which is overwhelmed by the acceleration and therefore see itself exhausted (burn-out).

Resonance theory is thus in the tradition of critical theory from Marx to Adorno and Horkheimer to Habermas and Honneth. It shares the central finding of alienation as an obstacle to a successful life, but attempts to contrast this description ex negativo with a positive counter-concept, the concept of resonance. Honneth, for example, has already made this attempt with the concept of recognition. Despite all the conceded vagueness and diversity of the concept of resonance, Rosa sees this as a universal concept that includes concepts such as recognition, justice or self-efficacy.

Reception 
Rosa's work and the resonance theory formulated in it are controversially received and discussed. On the one hand, the author is attested originality and the courage to analyse the fundamental issues and, in contrast to the Critical Theory often summarised with Adorno's "There is no right life in the wrong one" ("Es gibt kein richtiges Leben im falschen"), the optimistic perspective is emphasised which is oriented towards potentials for overcoming the stated crisis. Such an appreciation of resonance theory as a positive continuation of critical theory can be found with Anna Henkel. Micha Brumlik sees in the comprehensive combination of interdisciplinary strands the completion, but with it also the end, of Critical Theory, which thereby loses its "theoretically informed irreconcilability looking coldly at society".

On the other hand, it is precisely this comprehensive derivation of the concept of resonance from a multitude of perspectives and contexts that is criticized to the effect that "resonance" has an almost arbitrary effect, that the concept lacks precision, and that it is therefore ultimately unsuitable as a social-philosophical basic concept, as Rosa postulates it to be.

Another point of criticism refers to Rosa's alleged recourse to the intellectual world of Romanticism, to which he wanted to return without pointing the way. Rosa does indeed frequently refer to the resonance sensitivity of Romanticism even in conscious contradiction to rationalist concepts, but at the same time sees the danger of purely subjective emotion instead of resonance in the way Romanticism thinks. Thus he rather describes the continuing effect of the resonance concepts of Romanticism in modernity, without propagating a return to it.

Finally, Rosa's book argues that the socio-political outlook on concrete solutions is poor and that he ultimately fails to explain how resonance can be socially established as a response to the accelerating crisis of modernity. Despite the reference to political reform proposals such as that of an unconditional basic income and emerging pilot projects of a post-growth economy, Rosa himself rejects this claim, however, because he shares "the question of how one could get from the social formations of 'the Middle Ages' into modernity: In both cases it is a fundamental transformation of the world relationship..."

References 

Sociological theories